Perotrochus oishii is a species of large sea snail, a marine gastropod mollusk in the family Pleurotomariidae, the slit snails.

Description
The shell grows to a length of 70 mm.

Distribution
This species occurs in the East China Sea and off Japan.

References

 Anseeuw, P. & Goto, Y., 2004. Note on a reassessment of the taxonomic status of Mikadotrochus oishii Shikama, 1973, a pleurotomariid (Mollusca: Pleurotomariidae) from the East China Sea. Novapex 5(1):43-48

External links
 To Encyclopedia of Life
 To World Register of Marine Species
 

Pleurotomariidae
Gastropods described in 1973